Atlético de Porcuna Club de Fútbol, known as Atlético Porcuna, is a Spanish football team based in Porcuna, in the autonomous community of Andalusia. Founded in 1975 it currently plays in Tercera División RFEF – Group 9, holding home matches at Estadio Municipal San Benito, with a capacity of 1,200 spectators.

History 
The club was founded in 1975 and played in the lower regional categories, achieving the first promotion to the Tercera División in 2019.

Season to season

2 seasons in Tercera División
1 season in Tercera División RFEF

References 

1975 establishments in Spain
Association football clubs established in 1975
Football clubs in Andalusia
Province of Jaén (Spain)